Christian Schaller (born 1967) is a German Roman Catholic theologian from Munich. In June 2013, he was co-recipient, with Richard A. Burridge, of the Ratzinger Prize.

Life
Schaller was born in Munich in 1967. He studied at the faculty of theology of the Ludwig Maximilian University of Munich. Already during his diploma thesis (Diplomarbeit), he dealt with one aspect of the theology of Joseph Ratzinger, soon to be Benedict XVI: The Eucharistic Ecclesiology in the context of the sacramentality of the Church was the title of the paper presented by  Gerhard Ludwig Müller.

From 1997 to 2000, he was a research associate professor of systematic theology for future secondary school teachers at the Ludwig-Maximilians-Universität in Munich and the Research Project known as Religion: the history a fundamental concept in modern Christianity from Antiquity up to the twentieth century.

During his period as a research assistant of the chair of dogmatic theology (2000–2003) at the University of Munich, he produced his doctoral thesis showing that, compared to the nineteenth century, which ecclesiological developments led to an intense aggiornamento of the Church in the Second Vatican Council and were included in the Constitution on the Church Lumen gentium. In the foreground is an analysis of the concept "sacramentality of the Church" in the New Testament and its coordinates in the history of theology as well as its systematic exposure to the nineteenth and twentieth centuries.

From 2003 to 2012, Schaller was the theological collaborator of Gerhard Ludwig Müller, Bishop of Regensburg, and at the same time, since 2008, Deputy Director (vicar) of the Institut Papst Benedikt XVI, which is responsible for the edition of the publication complete works of Joseph Ratzinger, the establishment of a specialized library and an archive for scientific research work of the theological Papa Emeritus.

Publications 
Among the publications of Schaller are his contributions Catholicity not lost, Joseph Ratzinger and the Orthodox Churches and – as co-editor – the Ratzinger-Studien (since 2008) and the communications Mitteilingen. Institut Papst Benedikt XVI. (since 2008). The main topics of the work of Schaller are Christology and ecclesiology.

References

Further reading
 
 

21st-century German Catholic theologians
1967 births
Living people
Ludwig Maximilian University of Munich alumni
20th-century German Catholic theologians
Ratzinger Prize laureates